"The Trade-Ins" is episode 96 of the American television anthology series The Twilight Zone.

Opening narration

Plot
An elderly couple, John and Marie Holt, visit a medical center specializing in a new technology: trading aged bodies in for younger models. The center representative, Mr. Vance, tells them that 98% of couples have been happy with the quality of the swap, but the company offers a guarantee that if they change their mind afterwards within one week, the swap procedure can be reversed. The swap costs $5,000 per body. John and Marie have only $5,000, and government regulations prohibit extension of credit for the procedure. Since John's health problems and constant physical pain make a body swap particularly imperative for him, Marie suggests that he alone do it, but John refuses to go through with the procedure unless they can do it together.

John attempts to earn the rest of the money in a high-stakes poker game. He loses most of his $5,000 over several hands. In a final hand, he must put the remaining amount on the table in order to call against Faraday, the only other player who has not folded on that hand. By coincidence, the total pot for the hand is $5,000. Faraday inquires why John is taking such a risk. John explains his situation and reveals a hand of three kings. Moved by sympathy, Faraday lays his winning hand (three aces) face down on the table and says John is the hand's winner, thus allowing him to leave with the same amount he started with. John admits to Faraday that he cannot endure his physical pain any longer and is going to have the procedure, then use his youthful body to earn the money for Marie to follow.

After John is transferred to a new body, and tells Marie how wonderful their new life will be. Marie breaks down in tears, unable to relate to a husband so much younger than her. John opts for the return clause, willing to cope with his pain in order for them to be together. His "old" body restored, Mr. and Mrs. Holt depart towards an uncertain future–but their love for each other is "younger" than ever.

Closing narration

References
DeVoe, Bill. (2008). Trivia from The Twilight Zone. Albany, GA: Bear Manor Media. 
Grams, Martin. (2008). The Twilight Zone: Unlocking the Door to a Television Classic. Churchville, MD: OTR Publishing.

External links

1962 American television episodes
The Twilight Zone (1959 TV series season 3) episodes
Television episodes written by Rod Serling